Carnival Story is a 1954 drama film directed by Kurt Neumann, produced by Frank King and Maurice King, starring Anne Baxter and Steve Cochran, and released by RKO Radio Pictures. It was made as a co-production between West Germany and the United States.

Sometimes this film is credited as a 3D feature, although it wasn't filmed or exhibited in a three-dimensional process. This idea in many sources may be based on a wrong note from Variety in 1953. Neumann simultaneously directed a German language version Circus of Love with Bernhard Wicki, Eva Bartok, and Curd Jürgens.

The melodrama set in a circus was filmed at the Bavaria Studios in Munich and on location in the city. The sets were designed by the art directors Hans Kuhnert and Theo Zwierski. The film was shot in Agfacolor with prints by Technicolor.

Plot
Grayson's traveling carnival comes to Munich with acts that include high-dive artist Frank Collini (Lyle Bettger) and silent strongman Groppo (Ady Berber). A local girl named Willi (Anne Baxter) picks the pocket of Joe (Steve Cochran), who works for the carny, but he ends up offering her a job.

Joe makes romantic advances to Willi, who tries to resist him but can't. Collini asks if she would like to become a part of his act, which involves diving into a flaming tank of water from a great height. He also proposes marriage on Willi's first night as part of the show.

Magazine photographer Bill comes to take their picture as the Great Collinis' fame grows. Collini beats Joe up after catching him with Willi, whereupon he plunges to his death after a rung on his high-dive ladder breaks.

Willi inherits $5,000. Joe spends the night with her, but the next morning, he is gone as is her money. She eventually gets Joe to confess that he sawed Collini's rung in two, deliberately causing his death. When Willi asserts her independence from Joe, he tries to strangle her. Hearing her cries for help, Groppo comes to Willi's rescue and chases Joe who tries to escape on a Ferris wheel.  Groppo climbs to the top of the wheel and throws Joe off, killing Joe; and Groppo is led away by the police.

Cast 
Anne Baxter as Willi
Steve Cochran as Joe Hammond
Lyle Bettger as Frank Collini
George Nader as Bill Vines
Helene Stanley as Peggy
Jay C. Flippen as Charley Grayson
Ady Berber as Groppo

Release
The King Brothers later sued RKO for mismanaging the distribution and sale of the film, claiming $20,000 in damages.

References

External links

 
 
 
 
 

1954 films
1954 drama films
West German films
German drama films
Circus films
Films directed by Kurt Neumann
RKO Pictures films
Films set in West Germany
American multilingual films
American drama films
Films with screenplays by Michael Wilson (writer)
Films with screenplays by Dalton Trumbo
Articles containing video clips
1950s multilingual films
Films shot at Bavaria Studios
Films shot in Munich
1950s English-language films
1950s American films
1950s German films